Dolna is a Bangladeshi film released in 1990. This Bengali film is directed by Shibli Sadik, and produced by Fazlur Rashid Dhali with the lead roles played by Alamgir and Rojina. The film is a remake of the 1985 Hindi language film Pyar Jhukta Nahi.

Plot
Industrialist Ishak Ahmed and his wife Flora visit Nepal with their only daughter Dola. There Dola meets a Bangladesh young guide named Sagar. They fall in love and get married without the permission of her father. They became parents of a baby girl, Dolna.

Cast
 Alamgir - Sagar
 Rojina - Dola
 Khalil Ullah Khan - Ishak Ahmed
 Roji Afsari - Flora
 ATM Shamsujjaman - Bandhu
 Dildar - Golam Gius
 Maya Hajarika - Sagar's Mother
 Baby Joya - Dolna

Awards
The film received four national film (Bangladesh) awards.

References

External links
 

Bengali-language Bangladeshi films
1990 films
Films scored by Alam Khan
1990s Bengali-language films
Films whose writer won the Best Screenplay National Film Award (Bangladesh)